Little Cherry is a Chinese media franchise created by Yangshang Jun. Owned by the Zhengzhou-based Xiao Ying Tao Comics Company, it is primarily comedy manhua featuring a girl whose name is Little Cherry. The "Xiao Ying Tao" name  is sometimes abbreviated XOYTO.

History
The Little Cherry character was created in the late 1990s while Yangshang Jun worked for the magazine Comics Monthly (漫画月刊). The comics originally appeared in the Southern Weekly newspaper and other media, and gained popularity in few months. Yangshang exited her job for a freelance one in September 1999. In August 2000, the Zhejiang Literature and Art Publishing House published the first Little Cherry comic book volumes which initially sold out. In the next month, Yangshang registered the Zhengzhou Little Cherry Cartoon Art Co. At one point there was a circulation of 17 million comic book copies. Derivative works and products included beverages, Flash animation, and toys.

In 2008, a 26 episode animated television series adaptation debuted on CCTV. The second season premiered in July 2010, when the third season was reportedly in development.

In October 2012, the Little Cherry Rescue Angels comic received the Golden Dragon Award for best children's comic.

Titles in other languages
 Arabic: 
 Vietnamese:

Plagiarism controversy
Media sources including Sina Games and Taiwan-based Liberty Times have included comparisons between the Little Cherry animated series and the Japanese manga and anime series Chibi Maruko-chan, such as their similar titles, in articles about alleged plagiarism in Chinese animation.

References

External links
 Website
 ComicYu website
 Weibo blog
 Comic.qq.com website
 Little Cherry season 1 — KoWe International
 Little Cherry season 2 — KoWe International

2000s Chinese television series
2000 comics debuts
2010s Chinese television series
Animated television series about children
Chinese children's animated television series
Child characters in comics
China Central Television original programming
Comics about women
Humor comics
Female characters in comics
Flash television shows
Manhua titles
Manhua adapted into television series
Works involved in plagiarism controversies